Trick or Treat is the fourth album by the heavy metal band Fastway. It was the soundtrack for the heavy metal horror film Trick or Treat and was released as a studio album in November 1986, a month after the release of the film. This was the final Fastway album to feature Dave King on vocals.

Track listing
All songs written by Fastway

Charts

Personnel
Fastway
Dave King - lead vocals
'Fast' Eddie Clarke - rhythm guitar/lead guitar, producer
Shane Carroll - second guitar
Paul Reid - bass guitar
Alan Connor - drums
Mick Feat - bass on track 8
Charlie McCraken - bass on track 9
Jerry Shirley - drums on tracks 8 and 9

Additional musicians
Pete Williams - Fairlight programming

Production
Will Reid Dick - producer, engineer
Eddie Kramer - producer, engineer on tracks 8 and 9
Stephen E. Smith - executive producer

References

1986 soundtrack albums
Fastway (band) albums
Albums produced by Eddie Kramer
Columbia Records albums